Scars & Stripes is the fourth album by North Carolina hip hop duo The Away Team, it was released on October 11, 2011, on 9th Wonder's label Jamla Records and Duck Down. The album's entirely produced by Khrysis, featuring contributions from their labelmates Big Remo, Heather Victoria, Actual Proof, HaLo, Rapsody and GQ as well as Evidence (of Dilated Peoples), King Mez, Talib Kweli, among others. Unlike their previous albums, this also features the group member and producer Khrysis as an emcee.

Track listing
 All songs written by S. Evans and C. Tyson, except as noted.
 "Intro" (1:29)
 "Bad News" (featuring King Mez & Blue Raspberry) (S. Evans, C. Tyson, W. Ricks III) (3:11)
 "Scars & Stripes" (3:04)
 "4 the People" (C. Tyson) (1:07)
 "Cheers" (featuring Heather Victoria) (S. Evans, C. Tyson, H. Gavin) (2:54) 
 "What Is This"  (featuring Evidence) (S. Evans, C. Tyson, M. Peretta) (4:16)
 "The Road to Redemption" (3:56)
 "Drift" (3:15)
 "Set It Off" (featuring Talib Kweli & Rapsody) (S. Evans, C. Tyson, T.K. Greene, M. Evans) (3:08)
 "Happenin’ Today" (1:30)
 "Hot Potato" (featuring HaLo & Sundown) (S. Evans, C. Tyson, A. Holmes, S. Fullenweider) (4:34)
 "I Ain't Mad" (featuring Jay Rush) (S. Evans, C. Tyson, J. Jennings) (3:56)
 "Paid" (Featuring Laws & Big Remo) (S. Evans, C. Tyson, M. Maldonado, R. Cash) (4:20)
 "Proceed" (featuring Enigma) (S. Evans, C. Tyson, S. Hendricks) (4:17)
 "Get Down" (featuring GQ) (S. Evans, C. Tyson, Q. Thomas) (3:47)
 "Picture This" (featuring Kelsy Lu) (S. Evans, C. Tyson, K. McJunkins) (4:04)
 "See U Later" (featuring Phonte) (S. Evans, C. Tyson, P. Coleman) (5:41)

Personnel
 
 Khrysis: Production, Vocals, Recording engineer, Mixing, Mastering
 Sean Boog: Vocals
 Zo!: Keyboards on "See U Later"
 Executive producer: The Away Team, 9th Wonder
 Associate executive producer: Dru Ha and Buckshot
 Photography: 7545 Photography
 Art direction & design: Warren Hendricks, Jr.
 Additional artwork: Skrilla

Samples
"Bad News"
"God Save America" by Congress Alley
"4 The People"
"Brooklyn Zoo by Ol' Dirty Bastard
"Road To Redemption"
"I Want You" by Marvin Gaye
"I Ain't Mad"
"Without Love" by Peter Brown
"Picture This"
"The Lady in My Life" by Lou Rawls
"See U Later"
"See You Later" by Truth

References

Duck Down Music albums
2011 albums
Albums produced by Khrysis
The Away Team (group) albums